John Miner or Minor may refer to:
John Miner (musician), American musician
John Miner (ice hockey) (born 1965), Canadian hockey player
John Miner (attorney) (1918–2011), Los Angeles prosecutor
John B. Minor (1813–1895), teacher of law
John O. Miner (1910–1999), U.S. Navy admiral
Jack Miner (1865–1944), or "Wild Goose Jack", U.S. born Canadian conservationist
John Minor v. Shurbal Tillotson on List of United States Supreme Court cases, volume 32

See also

Jack Minore (born 1938), American politician
John Mynors, MP for Newcastle-under-Lyme